Drochlin  is a village in the administrative district of Gmina Grodzisk, within Siemiatycze County, Podlaskie Voivodeship, in north-eastern Poland.

Monuments 
 Greek Catholic wayside shrine from 1881

References

Drochlin